Heidemarie Ecker-Rosendahl (born 14 February 1947) is a retired German athlete who competed mainly in the pentathlon and long jump. On September 3, 1970, at the 1970 Summer Universiade in Turin, she set a world record in the long jump at 6.84 m  that stood for almost six years.

Biography
She won the long jump gold medal in the 1972 Munich Olympics with a leap of 6.78 m, one centimetre ahead of Diana Yorgova of Bulgaria. Two days later in a thrilling pentathlon, she finished second to Mary Peters of Great Britain.

After the three events on the first day Rosendahl was in the fifth place, 301 points behind Peters. On the second day, she jumped 6.83 m in the long jump (one cm short of the record) and ran the 200 m in 22.96 seconds. She finished with 4791 points, 16 points better than Burglinde Pollak's world record. She held the world record for 1.12 seconds before Peters bettered it by 10 points on finishing her 200 m race in 24.08 seconds. To further prove her versatility, she helped the West German 4 × 100 m team with Christiane Krause, Ingrid Mickler-Becker and Annegret Richter to the gold medal and a world record; holding off the East German sprints champion Renate Stecher, in the process.

In 1970 and 1972 Rosendahl was chosen as the German Sportswoman of the Year. She had a degree in physical education and worked as athletics coach at TSV Bayer 04 Leverkusen (1976–1990) and Deutsche Leichtathletik-Verband (1993–2001). She is married to John Ecker, an American basketball player who won the 1969, 1970 and 1971 NCAA Championships as a member of the UCLA Bruins. Their son, Danny Ecker, was a world-class pole vaulter. Rosendahl's father, Heinz Rosendahl, was the German champion in the discus throw in 1948, 1951 and 1953.

References

External links

 Leverkusen who's who

1947 births
Living people
People from Oberbergischer Kreis
Sportspeople from Cologne (region)
West German female long jumpers
West German female sprinters
West German heptathletes
Athletes (track and field) at the 1968 Summer Olympics
Athletes (track and field) at the 1972 Summer Olympics
Olympic athletes of West Germany
Olympic gold medalists for West Germany
Olympic silver medalists for West Germany
Officers Crosses of the Order of Merit of the Federal Republic of Germany
European Athletics Championships medalists
Medalists at the 1972 Summer Olympics
Olympic gold medalists in athletics (track and field)
Olympic silver medalists in athletics (track and field)
Universiade medalists in athletics (track and field)
Universiade gold medalists for West Germany
Medalists at the 1970 Summer Universiade